Myo-inositol trispyrophosphate (ITPP) is an inositol phosphate, a pyrophosphate, a drug candidate, and a putative performance-enhancing substance, which exerts its biological effects by increasing tissue oxygenation.

Chemistry
ITPP is a pyrophosphate derivative of phytic acid with the molecular formula C6H12O21P6.

Biological effects
ITPP is a membrane-permeant allosteric regulator of hemoglobin that mildly reduces its oxygen-binding affinity, which shifts the oxygen-hemoglobin dissociation curve to the right and thereby increases oxygen release from the blood into tissue.  Phytic acid, in contrast, is not membrane-permeant due to its charge distribution.

Rodent studies in vivo demonstrated increased tissue oxygenation and dose-dependent increases in endurance during physical exercise, in both healthy mice and transgenic mice expressing a heart failure phenotype.

The substance is believed to have a high potential for use in athletic doping, and liquid chromatography–mass spectrometry tests have been developed to detect ITPP in urine tests.  Its use as a performance-enhancing substance in horse racing has also been suspected and similar tests have been developed for horses

ITPP has been studied for potential adjuvant use in the treatment of cancer in conjunction with chemotherapy, due to its effects in reducing tissue hypoxia.  Human clinical trials were registered in 2014 under the compound number OXY111A.  The substance has also been examined in the context of other illnesses involving hypoxia, such as cardiovascular disease and dementia

See also 

 Phytic acid
 Inositol
 Inositol phosphate
 Inositol trisphosphate
 myo-Inositol

References 

Phospholipids
Inositol
Signal transduction